Evans Glacier may refer to:

 Evans Glacier (Graham Land), Antarctica
 Evans Glacier (Queen Alexandra Range), Antarctica
 Evans Glacier (New Zealand)